McConigley is a surname. Notable people with the surname include:

Nimi McConigley, American politician
Paddy McConigley, Irish Gaelic footballer